Kansas City 5 is a 1977 studio album by Count Basie.

Track listing
"Jive at Five" (Count Basie, Harry "Sweets" Edison) – 5:30
"One O'Clock Jump" (Basie) – 3:53
"(We Ain't Got) No Special Thing" (Basie, Milt Jackson, Joe Pass) – 5:33
"Memories of You" (Eubie Blake, Andy Razaf) – 3:49
"Frog's Blues" (Basie, Jackson, Pass) – 4:55
"Rabbit" (Basie, Jackson, Pass) – 3:46
"Perdido" (Ervin Drake, Hans J. Lengsfelder, Juan Tizol) – 4:27
"Timekeeper" (Basie, Jackson, Pass) – 5:12
"Mean to Me" (Fred E. Ahlert, Roy Turk) – 5:00
"Blues for Joe Turner" (Basie, Jackson) – 4:55

Personnel
 Count Basie - piano
 Milt Jackson - vibraphone
 Joe Pass - guitar
 John Heard - double bass
 Louie Bellson - drums

References

1977 albums
Count Basie albums
Pablo Records albums
Albums produced by Norman Granz